The 2000 San Jose Earthquakes season was the fifth season of the team's existence, and the first year that the MLS team used the "Earthquakes" name. The team finished with the worst record Western conference as well as the league.

Squad

Current squad 
As of August 18, 2009.

Club

Management

Other information

Competitions

Major League Soccer

Matches 

(OT) = Overtime

U.S. Open Cup

Source:

Standings 

Top eight teams with the highest points clinch play-off berth, regardless of division.s = Supporters Shieldx = Clinched Playoff berth.

Overall 

Source: MLSSoccer.com
Rules for classification: 1st points; 2nd head-to-head record; 3rd goal difference; 4th number of goals scored.
(SS) = MLS Supporters' Shield; (E1) = Eastern Division champion, (C1) = Central Division champion, (W1) = Western Division champion
Only applicable when the season is not finished:
(Q) = Qualified for the MLS Cup Playoffs, but not yet to the particular round indicated; (E) = Eliminated from playoff-contention.

References

External links
San Jose Earthquakes season stats | sjearthquakes.com
San Jose Earthquakes Game Results | Soccerstats.us
San Jose Earthquakes 100 Greatest Goals 2000 | Youtube

2000
San Jose Earthquakes
San Jose Earthquakes
San Jose Earthquakes